Trilobites Link, 1807 is a disused genus of trilobites, the species of which are now all assigned to other genera.
 T. alatus = Sphaerophthalmus alatus
 T. desideratus = Paradoxides gracilis
 T. elliptifrons = Acernaspis elliptifrons
 T. emarginata = Isoctomesa emarginata
 T. hoffi =  Ellipsocephalus hoffi
 T. limbatus = Megistaspis limbatus
 T. mimulus = Tomoligus mimulus
 T. minor = Hydrocephalus minor
 T. mutilus = Carmon mutilus
 T. orphana = Orphanaspis orphana
 T. serratus = Apatokephalus serratus
 T. sulzeri = Conocoryphe sulzeri
 T. zippei = Placoparia zippei

References 

Disused trilobite generic names